Köşkerler, Demre is a village in the District of Demre, Antalya Province, Turkey. 

The village's economy is based on agriculture. Oranges, peppers, cucumbers, tomatoes are the principal crops grown in the village.

References

Villages in Demre District